Sideral Linhas Aéreas Ltda. is a Brazilian cargo and passenger charter airline based in Curitiba. It was established in 2010 as a subsidiary of Expresso Adorno Group as a charter cargo and passenger airline.

History
Sideral was founded in 2010, and belongs to the Expresso Adorno Group, headquartered in São José dos Pinhais; it started as a cargo airline. It currently operates flights of the Night Postal Network (RPN), a postal service that allows cargo to be sent to destinations in less than 24 hours, in addition to cargo transportation services in general. 

In early 2017, Sideral leased some Boeing 727s from Rio Linhas Aéreas, which later ended its operations. In December of the same year, the company received approval from National Civil Aviation Agency to transport passengers, and currently has three aircraft adaptable for this purpose in its fleet. 

In June 2019, the company requested authorization from ANAC to operate passenger routes from Congonhas Airport.

Destinations

Sideral has the following operating bases:

Fleet

Current fleet

Sideral fleet consists of the following aircraft (as of December 2022):

Former fleet
Sideral formerly operated the following aircraft:

See also
List of airlines of Brazil

References

External links

 

Airlines of Brazil
Airlines established in 2010
Cargo airlines of Brazil
2010 establishments in Brazil
Companies of Brazil
Cargo airlines